This list ranks the top 150 U.S. cities (incorporated places) by 2020 land area. Total areas including water are also given, but when ranked by total area, a number of coastal cities appear disproportionately larger. San Francisco is an extreme example: water makes up nearly 80% of its total area of 232 square miles (601 km2). In many cases an incorporated place is geographically large because its municipal government has merged with the government of the surrounding county. In some cases the county no longer exists, while in others the arrangement has formed a consolidated city-county (or city-borough in Alaska, or city-parish in Louisiana); these are shown in bold. Some consolidated city-counties, however, include multiple incorporated places. In such cases, this list presents only that portion (or “balance”) of such consolidated city-counties that are not a part of another incorporated place; these are indicated with asterisks (*). Cities that are not consolidated with or part of any county are independent cities, indicated with two asterisks (**). All data is from the 2020 United States Census.

See also

United States of America
Outline of the United States
Index of United States-related articles
United States Census Bureau
Demographics of the United States
Urbanization in the United States
List of US states and territories by population
List of US cities by population
Lists of US cities and metropolitan areas
United States Office of Management and Budget
Statistical area (United States)
Combined statistical area (list)
Core-based statistical area (list)
Metropolitan statistical area (list)
Micropolitan statistical area (list)
Largest cities in the United States by population by decade
List of cities proper by population (most populous cities in the World)
List of lists of settlements in the United States
List of United States cities by population density
List of United States urban areas

Notes

Gallery

References

Area
United States cities